Darbara Singh (1927-1998) was an Indian politician and former speaker of Punjab assembly.

He won election for Punjab Legislative Assembly in 1967 and 1969 as an Independent candidate, then in 1972 on the ticket of Indian National Congress. In 1967 he became the deputy minister for Public Works. In 1969 he became the speaker of Punjab assembly.

In 1996 he won Lok Sabha election on the ticket of Shiromani Akali Dal but in 1998 left the seat for Inder Kumar Gujral and he was appointed Governor of Rajasthan where he died in office after few days.

References

1927 births
1998 deaths
Governors of Rajasthan
Speakers of the Punjab Legislative Assembly
Indian National Congress politicians from Punjab, India